Azerbaijani fairy tales are works of folklore by the Azerbaijani people. They vary in context and subject and include tales from the heroic past of the Azerbaijani people and struggles with local and foreign oppressors. Spiritual, moral, social and philosophical views are reflected throughout these tales.

The tales hand down ancient national traditions and customs whilst depicting the natural beauty of Azerbaijan; its green valleys and pastures, magnificent mountains, purling rivers and blossoming gardens.

History

According to Horst Wilfrid Brands in Enzyklopädie des Märchens, there exists some connection between the narrative corpus of Azerbaijan and Turkey (even Turkmenistan).

The first recorded fairy tales are found in the heroic Oghuz Kitabi Dede Korkut ("The book of grandfather Korkut") of the 10th-11th centuries. For instance, there is a narrated tale about a monster-man who eats "two people and five thousand sheep" per day in Tepegoz's (a translation from Turkish – Cyclop) story.

Characters

Jirtdan is the most popular fairy tale character among children's tales in Azerbaijan, meaning "small" when translated from Azerbaijani. Many fairy tales are based on this character, who is distinguished for his keenness of wit, courage and bravery. He can simultaneously be an idler, but also very brave. The Div ('giant') is another popular character. Little Jirtdan acquires courage and bravery when he meets Div.

Another popular character of the Azerbaijani tale corpus is hero Mälik Mähämmäd (or Mälikmämmäd).

Types
Azerbaijani fairy tales are divided into three types in essence and content: fairy tales about animals, fairy tales about common people and magic fairy tales.

Azerbaijani fairy tales abroad
The second edition of National fairy-tales from Azerbaijan was published by Verlag Dr.Koster Publishing House (Berlin) on the initiative of the Azerbaijani embassy in Germany. Liliane Grimm is an Austrian researcher of Azerbaijani studies and author and translator of the book, whose first acquaintance with Azerbaijan was held at an exhibition of Azerbaijani artists in Vienna. Seventeen national fairy tales of Azerbaijan and The fox’s pilgrimage (parable by Abdulla Shaig) were included in the book.

The Tales of Malik-Mammed, a play written for children by Chris Bartlett (writer) inspired by Azerbaijani fairy tales, ran at Chelsea Theatre in London in March 2015 as part of the Buta Festival.

Characters
 Jirtdan
 Tig-tig khanim
 Tepegoz
 Malikmammad
 
 Goychak Fatma

References

Bibliography
 Brands, Horst Wilfrid. "Aserbaidschan" [Azerbaijan, Narrative Tradition in]. In: Enzyklopädie des Märchens Band 1: Aarne – Bayerischer Hiasl. Edited by Kurt Ranke; Hermann Bausinger; Wolfgang Brückner; Max Lüthi; Lutz Röhrich; Rudolf Schenda. De Gruyter, 2016 [1977]. pp. 861-865. .

 Folktale collections
 Зейналлы, Ханефи; Багрий, Александр Васильевич. "Азербайджанские тюркские сказки" [Fairy Tales of the Azerbaijani Turks]. Academia, 1935.

Further reading 

 Agirel, Seyfi. “Colour Symbolism in Turkish and Azeri Folk Literature”. In: Folklore 120, no. 1 (2009): 92–101. http://www.jstor.org/stable/40646493.
 Aliyev, Oruj. (2021). "On the Symbolism of Numbers Three, Seven and Forty in Azerbaijani Folk Storie»s". In: Revista Conrado 17 (78), 121-26. https://conrado.ucf.edu.cu/index.php/conrado/article/view/1651.
 Hasanova, Valida. "ПУБЛІКАЦІЯ АЗЕРБАЙДЖАНСЬКИХ НАРОДНИХ КАЗОК" [THE PUBLICATION OF THE AZERBAIJAN FOLK TALES]. In: The Ethnology Notebooks. 2018, 2 (140), 385—390. DOI: https://doi.org/10.15407/nz2018.02.385.
 oglu Huseynov, Bilal Huseynaga (2022). "Changes in Azerbaijani Folklore (structural and Thematic Possibilities of the Genre)". In: Revista Conrado 18 (87), 331-35. https://conrado.ucf.edu.cu/index.php/conrado/article/view/2534.
 Khudaverdiyeva, T. "Toponyms in the Organization of the Azerbaijani Folktale Space". In Akademik Tarih ve Düşünce Dergisi 9 (2022): 168-186.
 Mohammadi, Ramin, and Seyed Majid Alavi Shooshtari. “Gender Criticism in the Azerbaijani Turkic Folktale of the Book of Dede Korkut”. In: Enthymema, n. XXIX, 2022, pp. 62-73. http://dx.doi.org/10.54103/2037-2426/16030 https://riviste.unimi.it/index.php/enthymema
 Sattarov, Rufat. "Between the Supernatural and the Natural: Aspects of Religious Beliefs among the Azerbaijani Turks". In: Man and Nature in the Altaic World: Proceedings of the 49th Permanent International Altaistic Conference, Berlin, July 30 – August 4, 2006. Berlin, Boston: De Gruyter, 2020. pp. 299-312. https://doi.org/10.1515/9783112208885-036

External links 
 Azerbaijan Institute of Folklore (English site)

Collections of fairy tales
Azerbaijani literature
Azerbaijani folklore